Sofalcone (INN) is an oral gastrointestinal medication used in Japan.  It is a synthetic analog of sophoradin, a type of natural phenol found in Sophora tonkinensis, an herb used in traditional Chinese medicine.

References

Drugs acting on the gastrointestinal system and metabolism
Phenol ethers
Chalconoids